Riverton Township is one of twelve townships in Floyd County, Iowa, USA.  As of the 2000 census, its population was 508.

Geography
According to the United States Census Bureau, Riverton Township covers an area of 44.35 square miles (114.86 square kilometers); of this, 44.19 square miles (114.44 square kilometers, 99.63 percent) is land and 0.16 square miles (0.41 square kilometers, 0.36 percent) is water.

Cities, towns, villages
 Nashua (west quarter)

Unincorporated towns
 Carrville at 
 Midway at 
(This list is based on USGS data and may include former settlements.)

Adjacent townships
 Chickasaw Township, Chickasaw County (northeast)
 Bradford Township, Chickasaw County (east)
 Polk Township, Bremer County (southeast)
 Fremont Township, Butler County (south)
 Dayton Township, Butler County (southwest)
 Pleasant Grove Township (west)
 Saint Charles Township (northwest)

Cemeteries
The township contains these two cemeteries: Ligget and Riverton.

Major highways
  U.S. Route 218

Rivers
 Cedar River

Landmarks
 Bunns Woods County Park
 Howards Wood Recreational Area

School districts
 Charles City Community School District
 Greene Community School District
 Nashua-Plainfield Community School District

Political districts
 Iowa's 4th congressional district
 State House District 14
 State Senate District 7

References
 United States Census Bureau 2008 TIGER/Line Shapefiles
 United States Board on Geographic Names (GNIS)
 United States National Atlas

External links
 US-Counties.com
 City-Data.com

Townships in Floyd County, Iowa
Townships in Iowa